Philadelphus lewisii, the Lewis' mock-orange, mock-orange, Gordon's mockorange, wild mockorange, Indian arrowwood, or syringa, is a deciduous shrub native to western North America, and is the state flower of Idaho.

It was first collected for science by scientist and explorer Meriwether Lewis in 1806 during the Lewis and Clark Expedition, and so was named after him.

Description
It sends out long stems which are red when new and fade to gray with age, the bark shredding in small flakes.

At the height of flowering, the plant is covered in a mass of blossoms. The flowers have a heavy, sweet scent similar to orange blossoms with a hint of pineapple.

The fruit is a small hard capsule about 1 cm long with woody, pointed wings, containing many brown seeds. Drought will stunt fruit development and prevent the production of viable seeds.

The plant is somewhat similar in appearance to serviceberry.

Distribution and habitat 
Lewis' mock-orange occurs from northwestern California in the Sierra Nevada, north through the Pacific Northwest to southern British Columbia, and east to Idaho and Montana.

Though it is tolerant of moderate shade, it prefers full sun. It is common in open coniferous forests and on forest edges, and in drier regions of the Northwest it occurs mostly in wetter and riparian areas. It is also found in chaparral and seral communities.

It occurs on well-drained, moist sites, and is tolerant of rocky soil, and it is hardy from USDA zones 3 to 9.

Ecology 

The foliage of Lewis' mock orange is of moderate importance as winter forage for elk and deer in British Columbia, Idaho, and Montana. In Montana, a 1957 study found that it comprised 2% of mule deer diets in the winter and a trace in the summer.

The seeds are eaten by quail and squirrels.

It occurs in dense shrub habitats which provide good thermal and security cover for wildlife.

Philadelphus lewisii is able to spread vegetatively and from seed. It forms seedbanks in the top  of soil.

Fire ecology 
The shrub is native to relatively arid regions of the American West which experience frequent wildfires, and is therefore quite well adapted to fire. Although mock-orange is typically completely top-killed by fires, it will enthusiastically resprout from rhizomes and root crowns afterward. A 1971 study found that in the next growing season after a fire, mock-orange had already regrown to 50% of its previous diameter and height, and that those plants had an average of 28.9 to 38.0 sprouts per plant postfire compared to just 0.6 to 1.5 before.

Lewis' mock orange palatability for Rocky Mountain elk is much greater after fire, with 36.3% of twigs browsed compared to only 1.3% on adjacent unburned sites.

Human use

Ethnobotany
Native American tribes used P. lewisii for numerous purposes. The hard wood was useful for making hunting and fishing tools, snowshoes, pipes, combs, cradles, netting shuttles, and furniture. The leaves and bark, which contain saponins, were mixed in water for use as a mild soap.  The flowers were used in preparing perfumes and teas.

Cultivation
Lewis' mock-orange prefers full sun to partial sun. It is drought-tolerant, will grow in poor soils, and is suitable for xeriscaping. It provides a landscape with flashy flowers and a fruity scent.[[File:Waterton Mockorange Philadelphus lewisii 'Waterton'.JPG|right|thumb|Waterton Mockorange Philadelphus lewisii 'Waterton''']]

The Waterton Mockorange Philadelphus lewisii 'Waterton' was hybridized by the Alberta Horticultural Research Station in Brooks, Alberta, Canada. It grows to 4–6 ft. (1.2-1.8 m) in height. It is named for Augustus Griffin, who in 1933 noted that this plant was growing in what is now Waterton Lakes National Park in Canada.

SymbolismPhiladelphus lewisii'' is the state flower of Idaho. The plant is protected by Idaho state law along with other native wildflowers and shrubs, and it is illegal to collect wild specimens on public property for export, sale, or transport without approval.

References

External links

 Idaho Statutes: State Flower
 Jepson eFlora: Philadelphus lewisii
 Plants of British Columbia: Philadelphus lewisii
 University of Michigan, Dearborn: Ethnobotany of Philadelphus lewisii
 
 

lewisii
Flora of California
Flora of Oregon
Flora of British Columbia
Flora of Idaho
Flora of Montana
Flora of Washington (state)
Flora of the Sierra Nevada (United States)
Natural history of the California chaparral and woodlands
Natural history of the California Coast Ranges
Garden plants of North America
Symbols of Idaho